Molina or La Molina may refer to:

People
Molina (surname)

Places

Chile
 Molina, Chile, a town and municipality in Curicó Province, Chile

Italy
 Castelletto Molina, a municipality in the Province of Asti, Piedmont region
 Castello-Molina di Fiemme, a municipality in the Province of Trento, Trentino-Alto Adige/Südtirol region
 Molina (Pecetto di Valenza), a hamlet forming part of the commune of Pecetto di Valenza, in the Province of Asti, Piedmont region
 A civil parish of the municipality of Vietri sul Mare (SA)
 Molina Aterno, a town in the Province of L’Aquila in the Abruzzo region of Italy
 Molina di Ledro, a former municipality in the Province of Trento, Trentino-Alto Adige/Südtirol region

Peru
 La Molina District, a district of Lima Province, Peru

Spain
 La Molina (ski resort), a ski resort in Catalonia
 Molina de Aragón, a municipality in the province of Guadalajara
 Molina de Segura, a municipality in the province of Murcia
 Taifa of Molina, a mediaeval kingdom under Muslim control that existed from around the 1080s to 1100

Switzerland
 Molina, Switzerland, in the municipality of Buseno, Grisons

United States
 Molina, Colorado, United States, an unincorporated town

Institutions
 Moisés E. Molina High School, Dallas, Texas, United States
 Molina's Cantina, a Tex-Mex restaurant in Houston, Texas
 La Molina National Agrarian University (Universidad Nacional Agraria La Molina), Lima, Peru

Arts and entertainment
 Molina's Culpa, a 1993 Cuban short film that pioneered the blood and gore genre in Cuba
 "Molina", a song by Creedence Clearwater Revival on the 1971 album Pendulum

Other uses
 Molina, a common name for the plant Dysopsis glechomoides
 Molina's hog-nosed skunk (Conepatus chinga), a South American skunk species
 Molina Healthcare, an American managed care company
 Ballester–Molina, semi-automatic pistol, Argentina, introduced 1938

See also
 Malena (disambiguation)
 Malina (disambiguation)
 Melena
 Melina (disambiguation)
 Milena (disambiguation)
 Milina, Serbia
 Molena, Georgia, United States
 Moline (disambiguation)
 Molinism
 Molniya (disambiguation)